Feuer is the German language word for fire. It may also refer to:

People
See Feuer (surname)

Music
Feuer (song), German entry in the Eurovision Song Contest 1978, performed by Ireen Sheer
Feuer frei!, a song by Neue Deutsche Härte band Rammstein
Feuer (single), a single recorded by Swiss band Lacrimosa

See also
Feuerland, a 19th-century designation for the industrial nucleus of Berlin